Soundchaser is the 17th studio album by the German heavy metal band Rage, released in 2003 by SPV/Steamhammer.

This is a concept album featuring a science fiction/horror story about the Soundchaser, Rage's mascot. A biomechanoid creature, crafted by the elders to serve as a sentinel, it has turned into a monster, attacking anything that issues a sound.

Track listing

Personnel
 Band members
Peter "Peavy" Wagner - vocals, bass guitar
Victor Smolski - guitars, piano, keyboards, sitar, orchestral arrangements
Mike Terrana - drums

 Additional musicians
Andi Deris - vocals on "Wake the Nightmares"
Thomas Hackmann - backing vocals

 Production
Charlie Bauerfeind - producer, mixing, mastering
Ingo 'Charly' Czajkowski - engineer
Jan Rubach - additional digital editing

References 

2003 albums
Rage (German band) albums
SPV/Steamhammer albums
Concept albums
Albums produced by Charlie Bauerfeind